Raja Amareshwara Nayak is an Indian politician who is the current Member of Parliament in the Lok Sabha from Raichur, Karnataka in the 2019 Indian general election as member of the Bharatiya Janata Party.

Early life and background 
Raja Amareshwara Naik was born to Raja Narasimha Naik and Lakshmidevamma on 16 Jun 1957 in Guntagula of Raichur Dist, Karnataka.

Raja Amareshwara Naik completed his B.A., LL.B. (Spl) from SJM College, Chitradurga, Mysore University and Karnataka University, Karnataka.

Position Held

References

India MPs 2019–present
Lok Sabha members from Karnataka
Living people
Bharatiya Janata Party politicians from Karnataka
People from Raichur
1957 births